Veliyattam is a 1981 Indian Malayalam film, directed by P. T. Rajan and produced by Thomas Mathew. The film stars Menaka, M. G. Soman, Nisha Chowdhary and Ravikumar in the lead roles. The film has musical score by M. K. Arjunan.

Cast
Menaka as Jaanu
M. G. Soman as Vishwam
Nisha Chowdhary as Vasanthi
Ravikumar as Ravi
Santhakumari as Lakshmiyamma
Oduvil Unnikrishnan as Mani
P. K. Abraham as Kurup
Poojappura Ravi as Paramu
Bobby Kottarakkara as Appu
C. I. Paul as Damu
Alummoodan as Foreign Thankachan
Adoor Bhavani as Mariya
Paravoor Bharathan as Menon
Remadevi as Pulluvathi
Sairabhanu as Sathyabhama

Soundtrack
The music was composed by M. K. Arjunan and the lyrics were written by Poovachal Khader and Alappuzha Rajasekharan Nair.

References

External links
 

1981 films
1980s Malayalam-language films